Arena Saddle is a saddle  west of Altar Mountain, situated at the midpoint of the east–west ridge which forms the head of Arena Valley in the Quartermain Mountains, Victoria Land. Named in association with Arena Valley, the name was approved by the New Zealand Antarctic Place-Names Committee from a proposal by C.T. McElroy who, with G. Rose and K.J. Whitby, carried out geological work in these mountains, 1980–81.

References 

Mountain passes of Victoria Land
Scott Coast